The 2017–18 Drexel Dragons women's basketball team represented Drexel University during the 2017–18 NCAA Division I women's basketball season. The Dragons, led by fifteenth year head coach Denise Dillon, played their home games at the Daskalakis Athletic Center and were members of the Colonial Athletic Association (CAA). They finished the season 27–8, 16–2 in CAA play to share the CAA regular season title with James Madison. They advanced to the championship game of the CAA women's tournament where they lost to Elon. They received an automatic trip to the Women's National Invitational Tournament where they defeated Robert Morris in the first round before losing to Fordham in the second round.

Off season

Departures

2017 Recruiting Class

Class of 2018 early commitments

Class of 2019 early commitments

Roster

Schedule

|-
!colspan=12 style=| Exhibition
|-

|-
!colspan=12 style=| Non-conference regular season

|-
!colspan=12 style=| CAA regular season

|-
!colspan=12 style=| CAA Tournament

|-
!colspan=12 style=| WNIT

See also
2017–18 Drexel Dragons men's basketball team

References

Drexel Dragons women's basketball seasons
Drexel
Drexel
Drexel
Drexel